WD Moore & Co Warehouse complex is on Henry Street, Fremantle. It was unified in 1899 behind an ornamental stucco facade. A store was established on the site by Samuel Moore in the 1840s. William Dalgety Moore later established a general merchant business there in 1862. The complex comprises a residence, warehouse, factory stable, offices and shop, built between 1862 and 1899, in addition to a three-storey backstore which was built at an unknown date, possibly as early as 1844. The complex was listed on the Register of the National Estate in 1978.

The business had a wide variety of activities including importing, processing, manufacturing and retail, with mail order distribution as well. Moore's product lines included food stuffs, beer, wine, flour, coffee and spices as well as hardware and mining equipment.

At various stages it was threatened by fires.

The Moore family originally attempted to sell in 1952, and eventually sold the premises in 1956 to the Stevenson family, who operated a transport company.

In 1985 the City of Fremantle purchased the property and restored it through 1985/86 with a grant from the Commonwealth Government as part of the preparations for the America's Cup defence. Since then the complex has been used for public events and exhibitions.

References
 

Art museums and galleries in Western Australia
Convention centres in Australia
Henry Street, Fremantle
Buildings and structures completed in 1899
1899 establishments in Australia
State Register of Heritage Places in the City of Fremantle